Bejawada or Bezawada is a 2011 Indian Telugu-language action crime film based on the Vijayawada Gang Warfare, directed by Vivek Krishna and produced by Ram Gopal Varma and Renny Johnson. The film stars Naga Chaitanya and Amala Paul. The movie was received negatively at the box office but positively at the television and ott as it accurately depicted the historical gang war in Vijayawada. Later it was dubbed in Hindi as Hero: The Action Man (2013) and also in Tamil as Vikram Dhadha. It marked Amala’s Telugu debut.

Plot 
Kali Prasad, aka Kali (Prabhu), is the man of the masses in Bejawada. His group has a stronghold on the temple city. Vijay Krishna (Mukul Dev) is the right hand to Kali. Kali's brother Shankar Prasad aka Shankar (Abhimanyu Singh), does not like the supremacy of Vijay Krishna. Due to this personal grudge, Shankar plays the spoil sport of brutally killing his brother Kali and then spreads the rumor in Bejawada about Vijay Krishna as the man behind this murder. With the help of politician Ramana (Kota Srinivasa Rao), Shankar plans to become a politician but fails due to Vijay Krishna's authority on Student and Labor Unions. Vijay Krishna has two brothers Jaya Krishna (Ajay) and Siva Krishna (Naga Chaitanya). Shankar assassinates Vijay Krishna for building his own identity. It is time now for cool, daring and dashing Siva Krishna to enter the scene for completing the revenge saga. How the love life of Siva Krishna with college-mate Geeta (Amala Paul), daughter of top brass policeman Adi Vishnu (Ahuti Prasad), is affected in the process forms another angle in the story.

Cast 
 Naga Chaitanya as Siva Krishna
 Amala Paul as Geethanjali
 Prabhu as Kali Prasad
 Abhimanyu Singh as Shankar Prasad
 Mukul Dev as Vijay Krishna
 Kota Srinivasa Rao as Ramana
 Brahmanandam as Sketch Gopi
 Ajay as Jaya Krishna
 Ahuti Prasad as Adi Vishnu
 M. S. Narayana as Veera Venkata Durga Prasad
 Subhalekha Sudhakar
 Prudhvi Raj
 Shravan
 Bharath Raju
 Satya Prakash

Production 
Ram Gopal Varma announced that he was to direct a Telugu film titled Bejawada Rowdilu in a press note in September 2010, which would revolve around the rowdy wars of Vijayawada, also known as Bejawada. The title started a controversy from vijayawada locales who felt that title wrongly defamed their city, so Varma in August 2011 announced that the film would simply be known as Bejawada. The film was officially launched on 12 May 2011 with Ram Gopal Varma's protégé, Vivek Krishna, announced as the director. The team held a photo shoot and filmed for two days in Vijayawada with Preetika Rao, before removing her from the project with the producer citing that she looked older than the lead actor, Naga Chaitanya. She was subsequently replaced by Amala Paul.

Critical reception 

The film received extremely negative reviews, both from critics and audiences. 123telugu rated it 1.75/5, lamenting that the film had "No of heroism in the first half, no villainism in the second half". Greatandhra rated it 1/5 and said that the film had "racha  to do with the history". Rediff.com rated it 1.5/5 and stated that "Bezawada is let down by its script". The Times Of India rated it 1/5 and said that "Despite all the expectations riding on it, "Bejawada" joins the long list of disasters  from the RGV factory."

Soundtrack 

The audio songs were released in an FM Studio in Hyderabad. Bejawada's audio release function was a rather low key affair. The songs were released in the market on 7 November. Vikram Negi, Bapitutul, Amar Mohile, Pradeep Koneru, Prem have scored the music for Bejawada.

Accolades 

SIIMA Awards
 Nominated – Best Female Debut (Telugu)- Amala Paul

References

External links 
 

2011 films
Films shot in Vijayawada
2011 crime action films
Indian crime action films
Films set in Vijayawada
2010s Telugu-language films